Percy Augustus Eisen (1885–1946) was an American architect. He is primarily known for his work in Los Angeles with Albert R. Walker as Walker & Eisen.

Biography

Early life
Percy Augustus Eisen was born on December 17, 1885 in Los Angeles, California. His father, Theodore Eisen, was a renowned architect. His mother was Annie (Bennett) Eisen.

Career

He designed the First Presbyterian Church of Hollywood.

Together with Albert R. Walker (1881-1958), he designed the Beverly Wilshire Hotel at the bottom of Rodeo Drive in Beverly Hills, California, the Bay City Guaranty Building and Loan Association in Santa Monica, the Ace Hotel Los Angeles, the James Oviatt Building, the Chamber of Mines and Oil Building, the Wilshire Royale Apartments, the Texaco Office Building,  the Ambassador Hotel, the Fine Arts Building, the Aladema Theater, the Four Star Theater, the Humphreys Avenue School, the Walter G. McCarty Office Building and Hotel Project, the Mid-Wilshire Office Building, the National Bank of Commerce, Plaza Hotel, J. W. Robinson's 1895 "Boston Store" at 239 S. Broadway (together with Sumner Hunt), the South Basin Oil Company Store and Office Building, the Sunkist Building, Taft Building, the United Artists Theater, and the Title Insurance and Trust Company Building.

Outside Los Angeles, they designed the El Cortez Hotel in San Diego, California, the Empire Theater and the Breakers Hotel in Long Beach, California, United Artists Pasadena Theatre in Pasadena, California, the United Artists Theater in El Centro, California, the First National Bank of Fullerton in Fullerton, California, the Public Library in Torrance, California, and the El Mirador Hotel in Palm Springs, California. They also built the Valley National Bank Building, the oldest skyscraper in Tucson, Arizona, in 1929.

Death
He died on November 18, 1946 in Los Angeles County, California.

References

1885 births
1946 deaths
Architects from Los Angeles